Lake of Ladies or Ladies Lake (French: Lac aux dames) is a 1934 French drama film directed by Marc Allégret and starring Rosine Deréan, Simone Simon and Illa Meery.

The film's sets were designed by the art director Lazare Meerson. It is based on a novel by Vicki Baum. It was released by the French branch of Tobis Film.

Cast
 Rosine Deréan as Danny Lyssenhop  
 Simone Simon as Puck  
 Illa Meery as Anika  
 Odette Joyeux as Carla Lyssenhop  
 Maroulka as Vefi  
 Jean-Pierre Aumont as Eric Heller  
 Vladimir Sokoloff as Baron Dobbersberg  
 Maurice Rémy Le comte Stereny  
 Paul Asselin as Brindel  
 Romain Bouquet as L'aubergiste  
 Eugène Dumas as Matz  
 Michel Simon as Oscar Lyssenhop 
 Anthony Gildès
 Germaine Reuver

See also
 The Three Women of Urban Hell (1928)

References

Bibliography
 Bergfelder, Tim & Harris, Sue & Street, Sarah. Film Architecture and the Transnational Imagination: Set Design in 1930s European Cinema. Amsterdam University Press, 2007.

External links
 

1934 films
1934 drama films
1930s French-language films
French drama films
Films based on Austrian novels
Films directed by Marc Allégret
French black-and-white films
Remakes of German films
Sound film remakes of silent films
1930s French films